Tim Burroughs (born October 14, 1969) is a 6'8" American basketball power forward from Jacksonville University and was drafted by the Minnesota Timberwolves in the second round, 51st overall in 1992.

References

basketpedya.com

1969 births
Living people
AEK B.C. players
American expatriate basketball people in Germany
American expatriate basketball people in Greece
American expatriate basketball people in Italy
American expatriate basketball people in North Macedonia
American expatriate basketball people in Spain
American expatriate basketball people in Turkey
American men's basketball players
Anadolu Efes S.K. players
Baloncesto Fuenlabrada players
Basketball players from South Carolina
Bayer Giants Leverkusen players
CB Breogán players
CB Zaragoza players
Greek Basket League players
Independence Pirates men's basketball players
Jacksonville Dolphins men's basketball players
Junior college men's basketball players in the United States
Liga ACB players
Minnesota Timberwolves draft picks
Montecatiniterme Basketball players
People from Hopkins, South Carolina
Power forwards (basketball)
Tuborg Pilsener basketball players